St Margaret's Church, Wormhill is a Grade II* listed parish church in the Church of England in Wormhill, Derbyshire.

History

The medieval chapel was enlarged and altered in 1746 when a low porch and west gallery were erected. In 1826 another gallery was erected over the communion table to accommodate the singers. It was rebuilt by the architect T H Rushforth of London and reopened on 16 June 1864. The contractor was Charles Humphreys of Derby.

Transepts were added between 1904 and 1910.

Parish status
The church is in a joint parish with 
St John the Evangelist's Church, Cressbrook
Christ Church, Litton
St Anne's Church, Millers Dale
St John the Baptist, Tideswell

Organ

The church contains a pipe organ by J. Porritt. A specification of the organ can be found on the National Pipe Organ Register.

See also
Grade II* listed buildings in High Peak
Listed buildings in Wormhill

References

Church of England church buildings in Derbyshire
Grade II* listed churches in Derbyshire